Hirsch Schwartzberg (Szwarcberg, Schwarzberg) (28 October 1907, in Vilna — 17 October 1987 in Ashdod) was a Jewish leader of Holocaust survivors under the American occupation of Berlin.

Schwartzberg was president of the Central Committee of Jewish Displaced Persons in Berlin. He controlled  activities of two adjoining displaced-person camps in Berlin, in Düppel and Mariendorf. As a witness remembers, in the years of his leadership there was no riots or violence in the camps.

All of Schwartzberg's family were murdered in the Holocaust except for himself, his wife, and their son. Together they survived the Vilna Ghetto. A couple weeks before its final liquidation in September 1943, theyalong with a few hundred other Jews from the ghettoescaped by obtaining permits to work in Karl Plagge's hastily expanded HKP 562 forced labor camp on Subačiaus Street in Vilnius. HKP562 served a few workshops spread out through Vilnius; one of its main tasks was retrofitting small trucks to use wood as fuel.  At the workshop to which Schwartzberg was assigned, he served as the workers’ spokesman.

The survival rate at HKP562 was higher than in the liquidated Vilna ghetto. Yet Plagge and his more benevolent officers could not avert the final outcome: Most of the Jewish workers of the HKP were murderedmainly by Ukrainian and Estonian SS forcesin July 1944, before Soviet troops occupied Vilna/Vilnius. Schwartzberg, with wife and son, survived by switching to new hiding places during the nightas their previous hideouts got discovered, and pursuing forces murdered Jews they caught. Most of those hideouts were makeshift and often overcrowded, increasing their likelihood of discovery.

For the Schwartzbergs and other surviving Jews, the subsequent Soviet occupation was a liberation. Yet Vilnius/Vilna, before the German invasion, was populated mainly by ethnic Poles and Jews. After the Nazi genocide in Lithuania, Vilna Jewish societyand the community that had nurtured Schwartzbergno longer existed. So, after the Schwartzbergs recuperatedand as the Red Army proceeded westward towards BerlinSchwartzberg and his family also left Vilnius and moved west. They arrived in Szczecin, Poland, and thenthree weeks after the German capitulationin Berlin.

Another calculation in Schwartzberg's decision to leave his hometown of Vilna was to avoid the Soviets’ forced migration east of many peopleincluding surviving Jewsfrom Lithuania. On arrival in East Berlin, Schwartzberg lied about his place of birth, claiming he and his family were from Lodz, Poland. Stalin was, at that time, deporting people from Lithuania and the other Baltic states, often shipping them east into the Soviet Union. 

In February 1949 Schwartzberg, and his wife and son, immigrated to the United States.

References

External links

 Photo: "Members of the administrative staff of the Schlachtensee displaced persons camp pose in the office of UNRRA camp director Schwartzberg", archives of the United States Holocaust Memorial Museum

1907 births
1987 deaths
Vilna Ghetto inmates
Lithuanian Jews
Lithuanian emigrants to the United States